Carabus cavernosus is a species of ground beetle in the subfamily Carabinae that can be found in Albania, Bulgaria, Italy, and in every republic of the former Yugoslavia.

Subspecies
The species have only 2 subspecies which are native to Albania, Bulgaria, Italy, and the republics of former Yugoslavia:
Carabus cavernosus cavernosus Frivaldsky, 1837
Carabus cavernosus variolatus Costa, 1839 Italy

References

cavernosus
Beetles described in 1837
Beetles of Europe